UK Property Shop Ltd – trading as UK Property Shop – publishes an online directory of UK Estate Agents and Letting Agents known as The National Directory of Estate Agents.

The Company 
UK Property Shop Ltd was registered as a limited company in 1999.  The official Registered Office address is 2nd Floor, Union House, 182–194 Union Street, London, SE1 0LH and the company registration number is 3804008.

UK Property Shop Ltd was acquired by REA Group in July 2008.  In August 2009, Zoopla acquired the PropertyFinders Group, consisting of the websites Propertyfinders.com, Hotproperty.co.uk and Ukpropertyshop.co.uk, with combined annual revenues of £7M, from prior owners the REA Group and News International for an undisclosed sum.

Operations 
The National Directory of Estate Agents is a searchable database of estate agents and letting agents dealing with residential property in the UK.  All agents are provided with a basic entry free of charge, but can pay to have their office promoted and for extra services. Individuals selling property privately (i.e. directly without an agent), as well as 'virtual' agents without a local business address, are prohibited from being listed in the directory. Access is free for viewers, who are capable of both finding estate agents in any location and linking to each agent's own website, as well as requesting information from estate agents about properties for sale or to rent.

In December 2007 the directory held details of about 18,300 offices of estate agents and letting agents.  Of this total, just over 15,000 offices were dealing with property sales, 10,000 with residential lettings and around 1,300 with student rentals.  There were just over 7,000 offices dealing with both sales and lettings, almost 8,000 offices dealing with sales only, around 3,200 dealing with lettings only and just 65 offices dealing exclusively with student rentals.

UK Property Shop also publishes a monthly 'Moving Location Index' report that ranks towns according to the proportion of people wishing to move into or away from that location.

References

External links
UK Property Shop website

Property services companies of the United Kingdom
Publishing companies established in 1999
1999 establishments in the United Kingdom